"Les Corons" is a famous French song by Pierre Bachelet and was written by Jean-Pierre Lang and music composed by Bachelet himself. "Les corons" is a regional hymn for the Northern miners of France. The iconic song describes the pride of France's miners, their life and struggle and their feasts, also integrating the music and folklore of the region. The single was released in 1982 on the Polydor record label. It was also included in the self-titled album Pierre Bachelet.

The supporters of the football club RC Lens use it as a chant. It also became a popular song of the students of École des Mines de Douai.

Track list
Vinyle 7"
"Les Corons" (Pierre Bachelet, Jean-Pierre Lang) – (4:12)
"Nos jours heureux" (Pierre Bachelet, Jean-Pierre Lang) – (2:56)

Versions
In 2010, the Quebec singer Jean-Philippe Bergeron recorded a version of the song in his album Elle est d'ailleurs, produced by Guy St-Onge and consecrated to 12 of Bachelet's best known hits. Pierre Bachelet's wife Fanfan Bachelet, accepted to sponsor the album.
In 2012, the French vocal quartet Les Stentors interpreted the song.

References

1982 songs
1982 singles
Pierre Bachelet songs
Polydor Records singles